The girls' cross-country cross freestyle cross-country skiing competition at the 2016 Winter Youth Olympics was held on 13 February at the Birkebeineren Ski Stadium. The  distance was 1.26km.

Results

Qualifying
The qualifying was held at 09:30.

Semifinals
Semifinal 1

Semifinal 2

Semifinal 3

Final
The final was held at 11:57.

References

 

Cross-country skiing at the 2016 Winter Youth Olympics